Finnoo (Finnish) or Finno (Swedish) is an underground station on the western metro extension (Länsimetro) of the Helsinki Metro in Finland. The entrances to the station located along the Finnoo Hill and in the commercial services block. The station opened on 3 December 2022, located 1,3 kilometres east from Kaitaa metro station and 1,6 kilometres west from Matinkylä metro station.

References

External links
Länsimetro work in progress

Helsinki Metro stations
2022 establishments in Finland